The Surrey Trophy is an annual rugby union knock-out club competition organized by the Surrey Rugby Football Union.  It was introduced in 2009 and the inaugural winners were London Irish Wild Geese.  It is the second most important rugby union cup competition in Surrey, behind the Surrey Cup but ahead of the Surrey Shield and Surrey Bowl.

The Surrey Trophy is currently open to  club sides based in Surrey and parts of south London, that play in tier 6 (London 1 South), tier 7 (London 2 South West) and tier 8 (London 3 South West) of the English rugby union league system.  The current format is a knockout cup with a quarter-final, semi-finals and a final to be held at Molesey Road (Esher's home ground) in May on the same date and same venue as the other Surrey finals.

Surrey Trophy winners

D

Number of wins
Chobham (3)
Guildford (2)
London Irish Wild Geese (2)
Camberley (1)
Cobham (1)
Chipstead (1)

See also
Surrey RFU
Surrey Cup
Surrey Shield
Surrey Bowl

References

External links
Surrey RFU

Recurring sporting events established in 2009
2009 establishments in England
Rugby union cup competitions in England
Rugby union in Surrey
Rugby union in London